Rion-des-Landes is a commune in the Landes department in Nouvelle-Aquitaine in southwestern France. On 1 January 2017, the former commune of Boos was merged into Rion-des-Landes.

Geography 
Rion-des-Landes is located in the center of the Landes department.

Population

Education 
Middle School : Marie-Curie
Primary school : Jean-Menaux

Notable residents
Marie-Thérèse Ordonez, also known as Maïté, restaurateur, actress and TV presenter
Gérard Dages, rugby player. Born on March 5, 1930, in Rion-des-Landes. Finalist of the French Rugby Championship in 1953 and 1959 with the Stade Montois.

See also
Communes of the Landes department

References

Communes of Landes (department)